Ilias Papageorgiou (born 1 January 1925) was a Greek footballer who played as a forward and a later manager.

Club career
Papageorgiou started football at the age of 13 in AE Chromatourgion, as outside right alongside Andreas Mouratis. In 1943 he moved to Apollon Renti, where he played inside right, a position in which he established himself. In 1944 he joined Atromitos Piraeus where he played until 1949. Then he was called to Piraeus Mixed Team and for the first time to the National team, without making an appearanece.

In 1949, he was transferred to AEK Athens without the consent of his club, as a result of which he was out of competition for two seasons according to the regulations at the time. He stayed at AEK until 1955, where in his first years he competed only in friendly matches and in 1950 he was called to the Athens Mixed Team. After leaving AEK, Papageorgiou returned to Atromitos Piraeus to end his football career.

International career
Papageorgiou played 14 for Greece scoring 4 goals, between 1950 and 1953. He also competed once in the men's tournament at the 1952 Summer Olympics.

Managerial career
After football, Papageorgiou involved in coaching and worked in many clubs, including Ionikos, Proodeftiki, Panargiakos, Vyzas Megara, Atromito Piraeus, Aias Salamina, Kallithea and Thriamvos Athens etc.

Personal life
As a professional footballer, he also worked at the Athens-Piraeus Electric Company and later at the PPC.

References

External links

1925 births
Possibly living people
Greek footballers
Greece international footballers
Olympic footballers of Greece
Footballers at the 1952 Summer Olympics
AEK Athens F.C. players
Footballers from Piraeus
Association football forwards
Atromitos Piraeus F.C. players
Greek football managers
Ionikos F.C. managers
Proodeftiki F.C. managers
Panargiakos F.C. managers